The Kilkenny Voice was southeastern Ireland's only weekly full-colour compact newspaper. It was published in Kilkenny each Tuesday; the first issue was published on 6 September 2005. Its primary competition was the Kilkenny People.

The editor of The Kilkenny Voice was Jimmy Rhatigan. The Kilkenny Voice ceased publishing on 18 December 2008.

The Kilkenny Voice sponsored Kilkenny City in the 2006 and 2007 League of Ireland First Division.

References

Defunct newspapers published in Ireland
Defunct weekly newspapers
Mass media in County Kilkenny
Newspapers established in 2005
Publications disestablished in 2008
Weekly newspapers published in Ireland